Trigger is a 2010 Canadian comedy-drama film directed by Bruce McDonald and starring Molly Parker and Tracy Wright as Kat and Vic, former rock stars reuniting their band Trigger for the first time since their retirement.

The film was originally planned in the late 1990s as a companion film to McDonald's Hard Core Logo, which would have starred Hugh Dillon and Callum Keith Rennie. However, work on the film remained dormant until McDonald and screenwriter Daniel MacIvor decided to rewrite their original screenplay to be about two women instead. Rennie does, however, appear in the film as his Hard Core Logo character Billy Tallent.

The film's cast also includes Daniel MacIvor, Don McKellar, Sarah Polley, Lenore Zann, Carole Pope and Julian Richings. Brendan Canning of Broken Social Scene wrote the film's score.

Wright was undergoing treatment for pancreatic cancer during the film's production. It was the last film she completed before her death.

Awards and nominations
The film garnered four nominations at the 31st Genie Awards, including Best Actress nods for both Wright and Parker.

Wright and Parker jointly won the prize for Best Actress at the 2011 ACTRA Toronto Awards. Wright's husband McKellar, who appeared in the film, accepted the award in her honour, stating in his speech that the award "means more to me than any I've ever won".

References

External links
 

2010 films
English-language Canadian films
2010 comedy-drama films
Canadian comedy-drama films
Films directed by Bruce McDonald
2010s English-language films
2010s Canadian films